John Joseph Meighan (1891 – 4 March 1978) was an Irish Clann na Talmhan politician.

A farmer by profession, he was first elected to Dáil Éireann as a Clann na Talmhan Teachta Dála (TD) for the Roscommon constituency at the 1943 general election. He lost his seat at the 1944 general election, but was elected to the 5th Seanad at the 1944 Seanad election by the Labour Panel. He was re-elected to the Seanad in 1948 and 1951. In 1954 he was nominated to the Seanad by the Taoiseach John A. Costello. He was defeated at the 1957 Seanad election.

References

1891 births
1978 deaths
Clann na Talmhan TDs
Clann na Talmhan senators
Members of the 11th Dáil
Members of the 5th Seanad
Members of the 6th Seanad
Members of the 7th Seanad
Members of the 8th Seanad
People from County Roscommon
Irish farmers
Nominated members of Seanad Éireann